Aydınbulaq (also, Aydynbulag and Aydynbulak) is a village and municipality in the Shaki Rayon of Azerbaijan.  It has a population of 885.  The municipality consists of the villages of Aydınbulaq and Şıxoba.

References 

Populated places in Shaki District